is a 1981 Japanese film directed by Yoshimitsu Morita.

Cast
Katsunobu Itō as Shintoto
Kumiko Akiyoshi as Elizabeth
Isao Bitō

Awards and nominations
3rd Yokohama Film Festival
 Won: Best Film
 Won: Best New Director - Yoshimitsu Morita

References

1981 films
Films directed by Yoshimitsu Morita
1980s Japanese-language films
Japanese sex comedy films
1980s Japanese films